Auto-Emancipation (Selbstemanzipation) is a pamphlet written in German by Russian-Polish Jewish doctor and activist Leo Pinsker in 1882. It is considered a founding document of modern Jewish nationalism, especially Zionism.

Pinsker discussed the origins of antisemitism and argued for Jewish self-rule and the development of a Jewish national consciousness. He wrote that Jews would never be the social equals of non-Jews until they had a state of their own. He called on Jewish leaders to convene and address the problem. In the pamphlet, he describes anti-Jewish attacks as a psychosis, a pathological disorder and an irrational phobia.

Pinsker had originally been an assimilationist, calling for greater respect of human rights for Jews in Russia. However, following massive anti-Jewish riots in Tsarist Russia in 1881, and a visit to Western Europe in the first half of 1882, his views changed. That year he published the essay anonymously in German. Pinsker's new perspective also led to his involvement in the development of the Jewish nationalist group Hovevei Zion, which he chaired. 

The essay itself inspired the group, and Jews throughout Europe, and was a landmark in the development of Zionism and the Jewish State.  The pamphlet was published on January 1, 1882.

Quotes
"The great ideas of the eighteenth and nineteenth centuries have not passed by our people without leaving a mark. We feel not only as Jews; we feel as men. As men, we, too, wish to live like other men and be a nation like the others…"

See also
 Jewish emancipation
 Isaac Rülf

References

Books about Zionism
Pamphlets
1882 non-fiction books
German-language literature
Pre-1948 Zionist documents